Enamul Haque is a Bangladesh Awami League politician and Member of Parliament from Rajshahi-4.

Early life
Haque was born on 21 October 1969. He completed his undergraduate in engineering and also has a MBA.

Career
Haque was elected to Parliament from Rajshahi-4 in 2008 and on 5 January 2014 as a Bangladesh Awami League candidate. On 16 September 2014, Bangladesh Anti-Corruption Commission recommended charging him with corruption regarding his company, Ena Enterprise. On 28 September 2017, local Awami League leaders in Rajshahi accused him of fermenting divisions in the Awami League and creating fractional feuds. He criticized Iqbal Sobhan Chowdhury, editor of The Daily Observer, after a report in the newspaper accused Haque of being involved with the drug trade.

References

Awami League politicians
Living people
1969 births
9th Jatiya Sangsad members
10th Jatiya Sangsad members
11th Jatiya Sangsad members